The 1806–07 United States House of Representatives elections were held on various dates in various states between April 29, 1806 (in New York) and August 4, 1807 (in Tennessee). Each state set its own date for its elections to the House of Representatives before the first session of the 10th United States Congress convened on October 26, 1807. They occurred during Thomas Jefferson's second term. Elections were held for all 142 seats, representing 17 states.

The Democratic-Republicans continued to build on their huge supermajority. They were actually able to take over two more seats than they had in the previous Congress, which they controlled by a margin of better than three to one. Commitment to agrarian policy allowed the Democratic-Republicans to dominate rural districts, which represented the bulk of the nation. On the other hand, supporters of the Federalists, even in their traditional base of support in the urban centers of coastal New England, continued to lament the ineffectiveness of their party and its lack of electoral appeal.

Election summaries

Special elections 

There were special elections in 1806 and 1807 during the 9th United States Congress and 10th United States Congress.

Elections are sorted here by date then district.

9th Congress 

|-
!  
| Nathaniel Alexander
|  | Democratic-Republican
| 1803
|  | Incumbent resigned November 1805 after being elected Governor of North Carolina.New member elected.Democratic-Republican hold.Successor seated February 24, 1806.Successor later elected to the next term, see below.
| nowrap | 

|-
! 
| John Cotton Smith
|  | Federalist
| 1800 
|  | Incumbent resigned sometime in August 1806.New member elected September 15, 1806.Federalist hold.Successor seated December 1, 1806.Successor declined to run for the next term, on a ballot the same day, see below.
| nowrap | 

|-
! 
| Joseph Bryan
|  | Democratic-Republican
| 1803 
|  | Incumbent resigned sometime in 1806.New member elected September 15, 1806.Democratic-Republican hold.Successor seated September 1, 1806.Successor was later elected to the next term, see below.
| nowrap | 

|-
! 
| Thomas Spalding
|  | Democratic-Republican
| 1805 
|  | Incumbent resigned sometime in 1806.New member elected before December 6, 1806.Democratic-Republican hold.Successor seated January 26, 1807.Successor had already been elected to the next term, see below.
| nowrap | 

|-
! 
| Joseph H. Nicholson
|  | Democratic-Republican
| 1798 
|  | Incumbent resigned March 1, 1806.New member elected October 4, 1806.Democratic-Republican hold.Successor seated December 3, 1806.Successor also elected to the next term, see below.
| nowrap | 

|-
! 
| Christopher H. Clark
|  | Democratic-Republican
| 1804 
|  | Incumbent resigned July 1, 1806.New member elected in early November 1806.Democratic-Republican hold.Successor seated December 1, 1806.Successor later elected to the next term, see below.
| nowrap | 

|-
! 
| Michael Leib
|  | Democratic-Republican
| 1798
|  | Incumbent resigned February 14, 1806.New member elected November 27, 1806.Democratic-Republican hold.Successor seated December 8, 1806.
| nowrap | 

|-
! 
| colspan=3 | None (District created).
| New delegate elected December 1, 1806.
| nowrap | 

|}

10th Congress 

|-
! 
| Levi Casey
|  | Democratic-Republican
| 1803
|  | Incumbent/Representative-elect died February 3, 1807.Seat remain unfilled in the 9th Congress.New member elected June 1–2, 1807.Democratic-Republican hold.Successor seated October 26, 1807.
| nowrap | 

|-
!  
| Barnabas Bidwell
|  | Democratic-Republican
| 1804
|  | Incumbent resigned July 13, 1807 to become Attorney General of Massachusetts.New member elected in 1807.Democratic-Republican hold.Successor seated November 2, 1807.
| nowrap | 

|-
! 
| James M. Broom
|  | Federalist
| 1804
|  | Incumbent/Representative-elect resigned in 1807.New member elected October 6, 1807.Federalist hold.Successor seated December 2, 1807.
| nowrap | 

|}

Connecticut 

Connecticut elected its members on September 15, 1806.

|-
! rowspan=7 | 
| Benjamin Tallmadge
|  | Federalist
| 1801 
| Incumbent re-elected.
| rowspan=7 nowrap | 

|-
| Jonathan O. Moseley
|  | Federalist
| 1804
| Incumbent re-elected.

|-
| John Cotton Smith
|  | Federalist
| 1800 
|  | Incumbent resigned sometime in August 1806.New member elected.Federalist hold.Successor was not elected to finish the current term, see above.

|-
| Timothy Pitkin
|  | Federalist
| 1805 
| Incumbent re-elected.

|-
| Lewis B. Sturges
|  | Federalist
| 1805 
| Incumbent re-elected.

|-
| John Davenport
|  | Federalist
| 1798
| Incumbent re-elected.

|-
| Samuel W. Dana
|  | Federalist
| 1798
| Incumbent re-elected.

|}

Delaware 

Delaware elected its member October 7, 1806.

|-
! 
| James M. Broom
|  | Federalist
| 1805 
| Incumbent re-elected.Incumbent resigned before the next Congress and declined the seat, leading to a special election, see above.
| nowrap | 

|}

Georgia 

Georgia elected its members October 6, 1806.

|-
! rowspan=4 | 
| Dennis Smelt
|  | Democratic-Republican
| 1806 
| Incumbent re-elected.
| rowspan=4 nowrap | 

|-
| David Meriwether
|  | Democratic-Republican
| 1804
|  | Incumbent retired.New member elected.Democratic-Republican hold.

|-
| Thomas Spalding
|  | Democratic-Republican
| 1805 
|  | Incumbent lost re-election.New member elected.Democratic-Republican hold.Incumbent then resigned sometime in 1806, leading to a special election, see above.

|-
| Peter Early
|  | Democratic-Republican
| 1804
|  | Incumbent retired.New member elected.Democratic-Republican hold.

|}

Indiana Territory 
See Non-voting delegates, below.

Kentucky 

Kentucky elected its members August 4, 1806.

|-
! 
| Matthew Lyon
|  | Democratic-Republican
| 1797 1803
| Incumbent re-elected.
| nowrap | 

|-
! 
| John Boyle
|  | Democratic-Republican
| 1803
| Incumbent re-elected.
| nowrap | 

|-
! 
| Matthew Walton
|  | Democratic-Republican
| 1803
|  | Incumbent retired.New member elected.Democratic-Republican hold.
| nowrap | 

|-
! 
| Thomas Sandford
|  | Democratic-Republican
| 1803
|  | Incumbent lost re-election.New member elected.Democratic-Republican hold.
| nowrap | 

|-
! 
| John Fowler
|  | Democratic-Republican
| 1797
|  | Incumbent retired.New member elected.Democratic-Republican hold.
| nowrap | 

|-
! 
| George M. Bedinger
|  | Democratic-Republican
| 1803
|  | Incumbent retired.New member elected.Democratic-Republican hold.
| nowrap | 

|}

Maryland 

Maryland elected its members October 6, 1806.

|-
! 
| John Campbell
|  | Federalist
| 1801
| Incumbent re-elected.
| nowrap | 

|-
! 
| Leonard Covington
|  | Democratic-Republican
| 1804
|  | Incumbent lost re-election.New member elected.Democratic-Republican hold.
| nowrap | 

|-
! 
| Patrick Magruder
|  | Democratic-Republican
| 1801
|  | Incumbent lost re-election.New member elected.Federalist gain.
| nowrap | 

|-
! 
| Roger Nelson
|  | Democratic-Republican
| 1804 
| Incumbent re-elected.
| nowrap | 

|-
! rowspan=2 | 
| Nicholas R. Moore
|  | Democratic-Republican
| 1803
| Incumbent re-elected.
| rowspan=2 nowrap | 

|-
| William McCreery
|  | Democratic-Republican
| 1803
| Incumbent re-elected.

|-
! 
| John Archer
|  | Democratic-Republican
| 1801
|  | Incumbent lost re-election.New member elected.Democratic-Republican hold.
| nowrap | 

|-
! 
| Joseph H. Nicholson
|  | Democratic-Republican
| 1798 
|  | Incumbent resigned March 1, 1806.Democratic-Republican hold.Successor had also been elected to finish the current term, see above.
| nowrap | 

|-
! 
| Charles Goldsborough
|  | Federalist
| 1804
| Incumbent re-elected.
| nowrap | 

|}

Massachusetts 

Massachusetts elected its members November 3, 1806.

|-
! 
| Josiah Quincy
|  | Federalist
| 1804
| Incumbent re-elected.
| nowrap | 

|-
! 
| Jacob Crowninshield
|  | Democratic-Republican
| 1803
| Incumbent re-elected.
| nowrap | 

|-
! 
| Jeremiah Nelson
|  | Federalist
| 1804
|  | Incumbent retired.New member elected.Federalist hold.
| nowrap | 

|-
! 
| Joseph Bradley Varnum
|  | Democratic-Republican
| 1794
| Incumbent re-elected.
| nowrap | 

|-
! 
| William Ely
|  | Federalist
| 1804
| Incumbent re-elected.
| nowrap | 

|-
! 
| Samuel Taggart
|  | Federalist
| 1803
| Incumbent re-elected.
| nowrap | 

|-
! 
| Joseph Barker
|  | Democratic-Republican
| 1804
| Incumbent re-elected.
| nowrap | 

|-
! 
| Isaiah L. Green
|  | Democratic-Republican
| 1804
| Incumbent re-elected.
| nowrap | 

|-
! 
| Phanuel Bishop
|  | Democratic-Republican
| 1798
|  | Incumbent retired.New member elected.Democratic-Republican hold.
| nowrap | 

|-
! 
| Seth Hastings
|  | Federalist
| 1800 
|  | Incumbent retired.New member elected.Federalist hold.
| nowrap | 

|-
! 
| William Stedman
|  | Federalist
| 1803
| Incumbent re-elected.
| nowrap | 

|-
! 
| Barnabas Bidwell
|  | Democratic-Republican
| 1804
| Incumbent re-elected.
| nowrap | 

|-
! 
| Ebenezer Seaver
|  | Democratic-Republican
| 1803
| Incumbent re-elected.
| nowrap | 

|-
! 
| Richard Cutts
|  | Democratic-Republican
| 1801
| Incumbent re-elected.
| nowrap | 

|-
! 
| Peleg Wadsworth
|  | Federalist
| 1792
|  | Incumbent retired.New member elected.Democratic-Republican gain.
| nowrap | 

|-
! 
| Orchard Cook
|  | Democratic-Republican
| 1804
| Incumbent re-elected.
| nowrap | 

|-
! 
| John Chandler
|  | Democratic-Republican
| 1804
| Incumbent re-elected.
| nowrap | 

|}

Mississippi Territory 
See Non-voting delegates, below.

New Hampshire 

New Hampshire elected its members August 25, 1806.

|-
! rowspan=5 | 
| Silas Betton
|  | Federalist
| 1802
|  | Incumbent lost re-election.New member elected.Democratic-Republican gain.
| rowspan=5 nowrap | 

|-
| Thomas W. Thompson
|  | Federalist
| 1804
|  | Incumbent lost re-election.New member elected.Democratic-Republican gain.

|-
| Samuel Tenney
|  | Federalist
| 1800
|  | Incumbent lost re-election.New member elected.Democratic-Republican gain.

|-
| David Hough
|  | Federalist
| 1802
|  | Incumbent lost re-election.New member elected.Democratic-Republican gain.

|-
| Caleb Ellis
|  | Federalist
| 1804
|  | Incumbent lost re-election.New member elected.Democratic-Republican gain.

|}

New Jersey 

New Jersey elected its members October 14–15, 1806. The Federalists ran a mixed ticket consisting of 2 Federalists (Aaron Ogden and John Beatty) and 4 Democratic-Republicans (William Helms, Ebenezer Elmer, George Maxwell, and Adam Boyd), one of whom (William Helms) was also on the Democratic-Republican ticket. The Federalists capitalized on resentment over the replacement on the official Democratic-Republican ticket of Ebenezer Elmer, from South Jersey, with Thomas Newbold from Monmouth County and the retention of James Sloan. This ticket was formed too late to gain sufficient support, but the Federalists did do much better in state elections that year than they had in previous elections.

|-
! rowspan=6 | 
| William Helms
|  | Democratic-Republican
| 1800
| Incumbent re-elected.
| rowspan=6 nowrap | 

|-
| Ebenezer Elmer
|  | Democratic-Republican
| 1800
|  | Incumbent lost re-election.New member elected.Democratic-Republican hold.

|-
| Henry Southard
|  | Democratic-Republican
| 1800
| Incumbent re-elected.

|-
| Ezra Darby
|  | Democratic-Republican
| 1804
| Incumbent re-elected.

|-
| John Lambert
|  | Democratic-Republican
| 1804
| Incumbent re-elected.

|-
| James Sloan
|  | Democratic-Republican
| 1803
| Incumbent re-elected.

|}

New York 

New York elected representatives to the 10th Congress on April 29 – May 1, 1806. This was the second and last election in which Districts 2 and 3 were elected on a joint ticket. New York redistricted in the next election.

|-
! 
| Eliphalet Wickes
|  | Democratic-Republican
| 1804
|  | Incumbent retired.New member elected.Democratic-Republican hold.
| nowrap | 

|-
! rowspan=2 |  / 
| Gurdon S. Mumford
|  | Democratic-Republican
| 1804 
| Incumbent re-elected.
| rowspan=2 nowrap | 

|-
| George Clinton Jr.
|  | Democratic-Republican
| 1805 
| Incumbent re-elected.

|-
! 
| Philip Van Courtlandt
|  | Democratic-Republican
| 1793
| Incumbent re-elected.
| nowrap | 

|-
! 
| John Blake Jr.
|  | Democratic-Republican
| 1804
| Incumbent re-elected.
| nowrap | 

|-
! 
| Daniel C. Verplanck
|  | Democratic-Republican
| 1803 
| Incumbent re-elected.
| nowrap | 

|-
! 
| Martin G. Schuneman
|  | Democratic-Republican
| 1804
|  | Incumbent retired.New member elected.Federalist gain.
| nowrap | 

|-
! 
| Henry W. Livingston
|  | Federalist
| 1802
|  | Incumbent retired.New member elected.Democratic-Republican gain.
| nowrap | 

|-
! 
| Killian Van Rensselaer
|  | Federalist
| 1800
| Incumbent re-elected.
| nowrap | 

|-
! 
| Josiah Masters
|  | Democratic-Republican
| 1804
| Incumbent re-elected.
| nowrap | 

|-
! 
| Peter Sailly
|  | Democratic-Republican
| 1804
|  | Incumbent lost re-election.New member elected.Democratic-Republican hold.
| nowrap | 

|-
! 
| David Thomas
|  | Democratic-Republican
| 1800
| Incumbent re-elected.
| nowrap | 

|-
! 
| Thomas Sammons
|  | Democratic-Republican
| 1802
|  | Incumbent retired.New member elected.Democratic-Republican hold.
| nowrap | 

|-
! 
| John Russell
|  | Democratic-Republican
| 1804
| Incumbent re-elected.
| nowrap | 

|-
! 
| Nathan Williams
|  | Democratic-Republican
| 1804
|  | Incumbent retired.New member elected.Democratic-Republican hold.
| nowrap | 

|-
! 
| Uri Tracy
|  | Democratic-Republican
| 1804
|  | Incumbent lost re-election.New member elected.Democratic-Republican hold.
| nowrap | 

|-
! 
| Silas Halsey
|  | Democratic-Republican
| 1804
|  | Incumbent lost re-election.New member elected.Democratic-Republican hold.
| nowrap | 

|}

North Carolina 

North Carolina elected its members August 15, 1806.

|-
! 
| Thomas Wynns
|  | Democratic-Republican
| 1802 
|  | Incumbent retired.New member elected.Democratic-Republican hold.
| nowrap | 

|-
! 
| Willis Alston
|  | Democratic-Republican
| 1798
| Incumbent re-elected.
| nowrap | 

|-
! 
| Thomas Blount
|  | Democratic-Republican
| 17931804
| Incumbent re-elected.
| nowrap | 

|-
! 
| William Blackledge
|  | Democratic-Republican
| 1803
| Incumbent re-elected.
| nowrap | 

|-
! 
| Thomas Kenan
|  | Democratic-Republican
| 1805 
| Incumbent re-elected.
| nowrap | 

|-
! 
| Nathaniel Macon
|  | Democratic-Republican
| 1791
| Incumbent re-elected.
| nowrap | 

|-
! 
| Duncan McFarlan
|  | Democratic-Republican
| 1804
|  | Incumbent lost re-election.New member elected.Federalist gain.Election was later contested.
| nowrap | 

|-
! 
| Richard Stanford
|  | Democratic-Republican
| 1796
| Incumbent re-elected.
| nowrap | 

|-
! 
| Marmaduke Williams
|  | Democratic-Republican
| 1803
| Incumbent re-elected.
| nowrap | 

|-
! 
| Evan S. Alexander
|  | Democratic-Republican
| 1806 
| Incumbent re-elected.
| nowrap | 

|-
! 
| James Holland
|  | Democratic-Republican
| 1800
| Incumbent re-elected.
| nowrap | 

|-
! 
| Joseph Winston
|  | Democratic-Republican
| 1803
|  | Incumbent retired.New member elected.Democratic-Republican hold.
| nowrap | 

|}

Ohio 

Ohio elected its member October 14, 1806. Both candidates were Democratic-Republicans, but from election articles published in The Scioto Gazette it was suggested that James Pritchard was the candidate of the Ohio Quids and that in a few counties, notably Columbiana and Jefferson, he was also supported by the Federalists.

|-
! 
| Jeremiah Morrow
|  | Democratic-Republican
| 1803
| Incumbent re-elected.
| nowrap | 

|}

Orleans Territory 
See Non-voting delegates, below.

Pennsylvania 

Pennsylvania elected its members October 14, 1806.

|-
! rowspan=3 | 
| Michael Leib
|  | Democratic-Republican
| 1798
|  | Incumbent resigned February 14, 1806.New member elected.Democratic-Republican hold.Successor also elected to finish the current term, see above.
| rowspan=3 nowrap | 

|-
| Jacob Richards
|  | Democratic-Republican
| 1802
| Incumbent re-elected.

|-
| Joseph Clay
|  | Democratic-Republican
| 1802
| Incumbent re-elected.

|-
! rowspan=3 | 
| Robert Brown
|  | Democratic-Republican
| 1798 
| Incumbent re-elected.
| rowspan=3 nowrap | 

|-
| Frederick Conrad
|  | Democratic-Republican
| 1802
|  | Incumbent lost re-election.New member elected.Federalist gain.

|-
| John Pugh
|  | Democratic-Republican
| 1804
| Incumbent re-elected.

|-
! rowspan=3 | 
| Isaac Anderson
|  | Democratic-Republican
| 1802
|  | Incumbent retired.New member elected.Federalist gain.
| rowspan=3 nowrap | 

|-
| Christian Lower
|  | Democratic-Republican
| 1804
|  | Incumbent retired.New member elected.Democratic-Republican hold.

|-
| John Whitehill
|  | Democratic-Republican
| 1802
|  | Incumbent lost re-election.New member elected.Democratic-Republican hold.

|-
! rowspan=2 | 
| Robert Whitehill
|  | Democratic-Republican
| 1805 
| Incumbent re-elected.
| rowspan=2 nowrap | 

|-
| David Bard
|  | Democratic-Republican
| 1802
| Incumbent re-elected.

|-
! 
| Andrew Gregg
|  | Democratic-Republican
| 1791
|  | Incumbent lost re-election.New member elected.Democratic-Republican hold.
| nowrap | 

|-
! 
| James Kelly
|  | Federalist
| 1804
| Incumbent re-elected.
| nowrap | 

|-
! 
| John Rea
|  | Democratic-Republican
| 1802
| Incumbent re-elected.
| nowrap | 

|-
! 
| William Findley
|  | Democratic-Republican
| 1802
| Incumbent re-elected.
| nowrap | 

|-
! 
| John Smilie
|  | Democratic-Republican
| 17921798
| Incumbent re-elected.
| nowrap | 

|-
! 
| John Hamilton
|  | Democratic-Republican
| 1804
|  | Incumbent lost re-election.New member elected.Democratic-Republican hold.
| nowrap | 

|-
! 
| Samuel Smith
|  | Democratic-Republican
| 1805 
| Incumbent re-elected.
| nowrap | 

|}

Rhode Island 

Rhode Island elected its members August 26, 1806. Rhode Island law required a majority of votes to win. In this election, only one candidate won a majority on the first ballot, and so a run-off election was required to choose the second seat.

|-
! rowspan=2 | 
| Nehemiah Knight
|  | Democratic-Republican
| 1802
| Incumbent re-elected.
| rowspan=2 nowrap | 

|-
| Joseph Stanton Jr.
|  | Democratic-Republican
| 1800
|  | Incumbent retired.New member elected.Democratic-Republican hold.

|}

South Carolina 

South Carolina elected its members October 13–14, 1806.

|-
! 
| Robert Marion
|  | Democratic-Republican
| 1804
| Incumbent re-elected.
| nowrap | 

|-
! 
| William Butler Sr.
|  | Democratic-Republican
| 1800
| Incumbent re-elected.
| nowrap | 

|-
! 
| David R. Williams
|  | Democratic-Republican
| 1804
| Incumbent re-elected.
| nowrap | 

|-
! 
| O'Brien Smith
|  | Democratic-Republican
| 1804
|  | Incumbent retired.New member elected.Democratic-Republican hold.
| nowrap | 

|-
! 
| Richard Winn
|  | Democratic-Republican
| 1802 
| Incumbent re-elected.
| nowrap | 

|-
! 
| Levi Casey
|  | Democratic-Republican
| 1803
| Incumbent re-elected but died February 3, 1807, leading to a special election, see above.
| nowrap | 

|-
! 
| Thomas Moore
|  | Democratic-Republican
| 1800
| Incumbent re-elected.
| nowrap | 

|-
! 
| Elias Earle
|  | Democratic-Republican
| 1805 
|  | Incumbent lost re-election.New member elected.Democratic-Republican hold.
| nowrap | 

|}

Tennessee 

Tennessee elected its members August 3–4, 1807, after the Congress began but before the first session met.

|-
! 
| John Rhea
|  | Democratic-Republican
| 1803
| Incumbent re-elected.
| nowrap | 

|-
! 
| George W. Campbell
|  | Democratic-Republican
| 1803
| Incumbent re-elected.
| nowrap | 

|-
! 
| William Dickson
|  | Democratic-Republican
| 1801
|  | Incumbent retired.New member elected.Democratic-Republican hold.
| nowrap | 

|}

Vermont 

Vermont elected its members September 2, 1806.

|-
! 
| Gideon Olin
|  | Democratic-Republican
| 1802
|  | Incumbent retired.New member elected.Democratic-Republican hold.
| nowrap | 

|-
! 
| James Elliot
|  | Federalist
| 1802
| Incumbent re-elected.
| nowrap | 

|-
! 
| James Fisk
|  | Democratic-Republican
| 1805
| Incumbent re-elected.
| nowrap | 

|-
! 
| Martin Chittenden
|  | Federalist
| 1802
| Incumbent re-elected.
| nowrap | 

|}

Virginia 

Virginia elected its members in April 1807, after the Congress began but before the first session met.

|-
! 
| John G. Jackson
|  | Democratic-Republican
| 1803
| Incumbent re-elected.
| nowrap | 

|-
! 
| John Morrow
|  | Democratic-Republican
| 1805
| Incumbent re-elected.
| nowrap | 

|-
! 
| John Smith
|  | Democratic-Republican
| 1801
| Incumbent re-elected.
| nowrap | 

|-
! 
| David Holmes
|  | Democratic-Republican
| 1797
| Incumbent re-elected.
| nowrap | 

|-
! 
| Alexander Wilson
|  | Democratic-Republican
| 1804 
| Incumbent re-elected.
| nowrap | 

|-
! 
| Abram Trigg
|  | Democratic-Republican
| 1797
| Incumbent re-elected.
| nowrap | 

|-
! 
| Joseph Lewis Jr.
|  | Federalist
| 1803
| Incumbent re-elected.
| nowrap | 

|-
! 
| Walter Jones
|  | Democratic-Republican
| 1803
| Incumbent re-elected.
| nowrap | 

|-
! 
| Philip R. Thompson
|  | Democratic-Republican
| 1793
|  | Incumbent lost re-election.New member elected.Democratic-Republican hold.
| nowrap | 

|-
! 
| John Dawson
|  | Democratic-Republican
| 1797
| Incumbent re-elected.
| nowrap | 

|-
! 
| James M. Garnett
|  | Democratic-Republican
| 1805
| Incumbent re-elected.
| nowrap | 

|-
! 
| Burwell Bassett
|  | Democratic-Republican
| 1805
| Incumbent re-elected.
| nowrap | 

|-
! 
| William A. Burwell
|  | Democratic-Republican
| 1806 
| Incumbent re-elected.
| nowrap | 

|-
! 
| Matthew Clay
|  | Democratic-Republican
| 1797
| Incumbent re-elected.
| nowrap | 

|-
! 
| John Randolph
|  | Democratic-Republican
| 1799
| Incumbent re-elected.
| nowrap | 

|-
! 
| John W. Eppes
|  | Democratic-Republican
| 1803
| Incumbent re-elected.
| nowrap | 

|-
! 
| John Claiborne
|  | Democratic-Republican
| 1805
| Incumbent re-elected.
| nowrap | 

|-
! 
| Peterson Goodwyn
|  | Democratic-Republican
| 1803
| Incumbent re-elected.
| nowrap | 

|-
! 
| Edwin Gray
|  | Democratic-Republican
| 1799
| Incumbent re-elected.
| nowrap | 

|-
! 
| Thomas Newton Jr.
|  | Democratic-Republican
| 1799
| Incumbent re-elected.
| nowrap | 

|-
! 
| Thomas M. Randolph
|  | Democratic-Republican
| 1803
|  | Incumbent retired.New member elected.Democratic-Republican hold.
| nowrap | 

|-
! 
| John Clopton
|  | Democratic-Republican
| 1801
| Incumbent re-elected.
| nowrap | 

|}

Non-voting delegates 

As in the previous congress, there were three territories with non-voting delegates in the 10th Congress. In Indiana Territory, the legislature elected the delegate. The source used did not have information about Mississippi or Orleans Territory. Mississippi used popular election in 1808, while Orleans Territory elected its delegate by the legislature in 1808, suggesting Orleans probably used legislative election this year, too.

|-
! 
| Benjamin Parke
|  | Federalist
| 1805
| Incumbent re-elected September 3, 1807.
| nowrap | 

|-
! 
| William Lattimore
|  | Democratic-Republican
| 1803
|  | Unknown if incumbent retired or lost re-election.New member elected.Democratic-Republican hold.
| nowrap | 

|-
! 
| colspan=3 | New district
|  | New seat.New delegate elected August 1, 1806 to finish the current term.
| nowrap | 

|-
! 
| Daniel Clark
|  | Unknown
| 1806
| Incumbent re-elected September 10, 1806.
| nowrap | 

|}

See also
 1806 United States elections
 List of United States House of Representatives elections (1789–1822)
 1806–07 United States Senate elections
 9th United States Congress
 10th United States Congress

Notes

References

Bibliography

External links
 Office of the Historian (Office of Art & Archives, Office of the Clerk, U.S. House of Representatives)